Carex andringitrensis is a tussock-forming species of perennial sedge in the family Cyperaceae. It is native to parts of Madagascar.

See also
List of Carex species

References

andringitrensis
Taxa named by Henri Chermezon
Plants described in 1923
Flora of Madagascar